Elmer Ward Bliss (March 9, 1875 – March 18, 1962) was a Major League Baseball pitcher and outfielder. In 1903, Bliss, as a pitcher, played in 1 game and got the win, going 7 innings with one run allowed. Then in 1904, Bliss appeared in a game for the Highlanders as an outfielder. He went 0–1 in the game. He batted left and threw left-handed.

External links

1875 births
1962 deaths
New York Highlanders players
Major League Baseball pitchers
Baseball players from Pennsylvania
Minor league baseball managers
Utica Pentups players
Waverly Wagonmakers players
Utica Pent-Ups players
Montreal Royals players
Rochester Bronchos players
Grand Rapids Orphans players
Grand Rapids Wolverines players
Montgomery Senators players
Montgomery Climbers players
Binghamton Bingoes players
Wellsville Rainmakers players